Beargrass Creek may refer to:

Beargrass Creek (Indiana)
Beargrass Creek (Kentucky)